The 1972 Omloop Het Volk was the 27th edition of the Omloop Het Volk cycle race and was held on 4 March 1972. The race started and finished in Ghent. The race was won by Frans Verbeeck.

General classification

References

1972
Omloop Het Nieuwsblad
Omloop Het Nieuwsblad